Matthew Paul Hewlett (born 25 February 1976, in Bristol) is an English professional football midfielder.

Career
He began his career as trainee with his local side Bristol City, turning professional in August 1993. He joined Burnley on loan in November 1998, playing three times in a short three week spell. He left Ashton Gate in July 2000, joining local rivals Swindon Town on a free transfer. He became the club captain at Swindon, before spending time out with a knee injury.

In July 2005 he moved to Torquay United, again on a free transfer. However, he struggled to establish himself fully at Plainmoor, mainly due to spending a long time out of the side with a serious back injury, which eventually forced his retirement on 2 February 2007.

On 29 September 2007 Hewlett played for Tiverton Town in their friendly against Buckland Athletic, after which Tiverton manager Martyn Rogers stated he was keen to sign Hewlett. Rogers managed to sign Hewlett on 18 October along with another player, Radley Veale.

References

External links

1976 births
Living people
Footballers from Bristol
English footballers
Bristol City F.C. players
Burnley F.C. players
Swindon Town F.C. players
Torquay United F.C. players
Tiverton Town F.C. players
Association football midfielders